Chestnut Street Historic District may refer to:

Chestnut Street Historic District (Hays, Kansas), listed on the National Register of Historic Places in Ellis County, Kansas
Chestnut Street Historic District (Camden, Maine), listed on the National Register of Historic Places in Knox County, Maine
Chestnut Street Historic District (Kingston, New York), listed on the National Register of Historic Places in Ulster County, New York

See also
Chestnut Street District, a historic district in Salem, Massachusetts